Mountain Interval is a 1916 poetry collection written by American poet Robert Frost. Published by Henry Holt, it is Frost's third poetic volume.

Background
The book was republished in 1920, and after making several alterations in the sequencing of the collection, Frost released a new edition in 1924. Five lyrics of the earlier collection were compiled next under the title "The Hill Wife". In this volume only three poems are written in dramatic monologue.

Poems 

 "The Road Not Taken"
 "Christmas Trees"
 "An Old Man's Winter Night"
 "The Exposed Nest"
 "A Patch of Old Snow"
 "In the Home Stretch"
 "The Telephone Machine"
 "Meeting and Passing"
 "Hyla Brook"
 "The Oven Bird"
 "Bond and Free"
 "Birches"
 "Pea Brush"
 "Putting in the Seed"
 "A Time to Talk"
 "The Cow in Apple Time"
 "The Encounter"
 "Range-Finding"
 "The Hill Wife"
 "The Bonfire"
 "A Girl's Garden"
 "Locked Out"
 "The Last Word of a Blue Bird"
 "Out, Out—"
 "Brown's Descent, or the Willy-nilly Slide"
 "The Gum-Gatherer"
 "The Line-Gang"
 "The Vanishing Red"
 "Snow"
 "The Sound of Trees"
 "Assertive"

See also
 1916 in poetry
 Robert Frost

External links
 Frost, Robert. Mountain Interval (1916), Henry Holt And Company 
 

1916 poetry books
1920 poetry books
American poetry collections
Works by Robert Frost
Henry Holt and Company books